Eleanor Pilgrim (born 15 February 1977) is a Welsh professional golfer and a member of the Ladies European Tour.

Amateur career
Pilgrim was born in Newport, Wales. She was a member of the Welsh Amateur International from 1995–2002, was Welsh Ladies' Amateur Champion in 1997 and 2002 and was the first reserve for the 2002 GB&I Curtis Cup team. She played her collegiate golf at Northern Arizona University gaining a Bachelor of Arts degree. She won the 1996 Idaho State Invitational and 1998 Lumberjack Invitational and was Big Sky Conference champion in 1996 and 1998. She was 1996 Big Sky All-Academic and All-Big Sky Conference 1996–1998. She played in the 2002 Weetabix Challenge where members of the Ladies European Tour take on the Great Britain and Ireland elite amateur squad and won the Sunningdale Critchley Salver.

Professional career
Having finished eighth at the 2002 qualifying school, Pilgrim made her professional debut on the Ladies European Tour in the 2003 season. In 11 starts her best finish was a tie for twelfth at her home Wales WPGA Championship. She had to return to qualifying school after a torrid 2004 season to retain her card but had her best career finish the following 2005 season when she lost the KLM Ladies Open to Virginie Lagoutte at the second extra hole.

Team appearances
Amateur
European Ladies' Team Championship (representing Wales): 1997, 1999, 2001

References

Welsh female golfers
Northern Arizona Lumberjacks women's golfers
Ladies European Tour golfers
Sportspeople from Newport, Wales
1977 births
Living people